Moberly is a surname. Notable people with the surname include:

Charles Moberly (1907–1996), English cricketer
Charles Frederic Moberly Bell (1847–1911), British editor of The Times
Clarence Moberly (1838–1902), Canadian civil engineer
Elizabeth Moberly, British writer about homosexuality
George Moberly (1803–1885), English divine
Charlotte Anne Moberly (1846–1937), English academic and (alleged) time traveller
Henry Edward Moberly (1822–1907), English amateur cricketer, school housemaster and Anglican priest
Henry John Moberly (also known as "Harry" or "Harvey") (1835–1931), Canadian fur trader with the Hudson's Bay Company
Capt. John Moberly (1789–1848), British naval officer stationed at Penetanguishene, Ontario
John Moberly (cricketer) (1848–1928), English cricketer
Mariquita Jenny Moberly (1855–1937), English artist
Patricia Moberly (1938–2016), British public servant, Labour politician, activist, and teacher
Patrick Moberly (born 1928), British diplomat
Robert Campbell Moberly (1845–1903), English theologian
R. W. L. Moberly (born 1952), British theologian
Tracey Moberly (born 1964), Welsh artist, author, activist
Walter Moberly (engineer) (1832–1915), English-Canadian engineer
Walter Hamilton Moberly (1881–1974), British academic
William Moberly (1850–1914), English cricket and rugby player

References